The  is a botanical garden operated by Hiroshima University and located at Mitsumaruko-yama 1156-2, Miyajima-cho, Hatsukaichi, Hiroshima, Japan. It is open daily except New Years and August; admission is free.

The garden was established in 1964 for botanical research and education. It is located on the north coast of Miyajima (Itsukushima) Island about 20 km from Hiroshima City. The island forms part of the Setonaikai National Park and contains the Misen forest, a World Heritage Site.

Most of the garden consists of natural forest and maritime vegetation, particularly subtropical species and halophytes, with about 350,000 specimens in its herbarium. Current research projects include studies of local vascular and non-vascular plants, especially bryophytes; ecology; and conservation biology.

See also 

 List of botanical gardens in Japan

References 
 Miyajima Natural Botanical Garden (Japanese)
 Miyajima Natural Botanical Garden
 Database of Research and Development Activities
 Jardins Botaniques entry (French)
 BGCI entry

Botanical gardens in Japan
Gardens in Hiroshima Prefecture
Hiroshima University
Hatsukaichi, Hiroshima